Hergesheimer is a surname. Notable persons with the name include:
 Ella Sophonisba Hergesheimer (1873-1943), American illustrator, painter and printmaker
 Joseph Hergesheimer (1880-1954), American novelist
 Phil Hergesheimer (1914-2004), Canadian ice hockey player
 Wally Hergesheimer (1927-2014), Canadian ice hockey player